St. Georges Technical High School is a public vocational-technical high school in unincorporated St. George's Hundred, Delaware, northeast of Middletown. It has over 1,100 students in grades 9–12 with a student-teacher ratio of 14 to 1. If desired, students at St. Georges can follow a Business, Communication, and Computers (IT Academy, web and print technology); Construction Technologies (carpentry; electrical trades; heating, ventilation & AC; plumbing); Health Services (athletic healthcare, emergency medical services, health information technology, medical assisting, nursing technology); Public and Consumer Services (culinary arts, the Teacher Academy for Early Childhood Education); Science, Energy, and Drafting Technologies (biotechnology, technical drafting & design); or Transportation (auto technology) pathway. Students typically graduate with some form of certificate in addition to their diploma.

History
St. Georges began instruction in fall 2006 and spent the first two months sharing space with Delcastle Technical High School at its Marshallton location while construction of its own building was completed. The first senior class graduated in 2010.

External links

References

High schools in New Castle County, Delaware
Vocational and technical schools in Delaware
Educational institutions established in 2008
Public high schools in Delaware
2008 establishments in Delaware